is a Japanese gravure idol, entertainer, actress, and sports writer who is represented by the talent agency, Lifika. She grew up in Hokota, Kashima District, Ibaraki.

Isoyama graduated from Ibaraki Prefecture Hokota Second High School.

Filmography

TV series

Films

References

External links
 

Japanese gravure models
Japanese female models
Japanese television personalities
Japanese female idols
Japanese actresses
Japanese writers
1983 births
Living people
People from Mito, Ibaraki
Models from Ibaraki Prefecture
Actors from Ibaraki Prefecture
Writers from Ibaraki Prefecture